De Rijke is a Dutch surnames meaning "the rich (one)".  Other forms include De Rijk, De Rijck and De Rijcke, while in Belgium the "ij" can be replaced with a "y" and the article can be merged with the adjective. The variants without an article (Rijke) can also be of patronymic origin ("son of Rijk"). People with such surnames include:

De Rijck / De Rijk / De Ryck / De Ryk / Derijck
An de Ryck (born 1960s), Belgian brewster
Beatrix de Rijk (1883-1958), Dutch aviator
Cornelia de Rijck (1653 – 1726), Dutch painter
Luc De Rijck (1965-1991), Belgian footballer
Rudolf de Rijk (1937-2003), Dutch linguist
Timothy Derijck (born 1987), Belgian footballer
De Rijcke / De Rijke / De Ryke / Derycke
Abraham de Rijcke (1566-1599), Flemish historical and portrait painter, son of Bernaert
Alex de Rijke (born 1960), British architect
Antonius de Rijcke (c.1475–c.1530), Flemish composer
Bernaert de Rijcke (c.1535-1590), Flemish historical and portrait painter
Germain Derycke (1929-1978), Belgian racing cyclist
Johannis de Rijke (1842-1913), Dutch civil engineer and foreign advisor to Japan
Luc Beyer de Ryke (1933-2018), Belgian journalist and politician
Maarten de Rijke (born 1961), Dutch computer scientist
Rijke
Pieter Rijke (1812–1899), Dutch experimental physicist
Robine Rijke (born 1996), Dutch cricketer
Sjaak Rijke (born 1960), Dutch Al-Qaeda kidnapping victim

As a nickname
People in the Low Countries nicknamed "the rich" include:
Beatrix de Rijke (1421-1468), Dutch foundling ("Lucky the Rich"), who survived a flood allegedly because a cat balanced her cradle in the flood waters
Maria de Rijke (1457–1482), Mary of Burgundy
Otto de Rijke (c.1060–1113), Otto II, Count of Zutphen
Willem de Rijke (1487-1559), Count of Nassau-Siegen, father of William the Silent
Willem de Rijke (1516–1592), William of Cleves

References

Dutch-language surnames